Hildur María Leifsdóttir (born 21 October 1992) is an Icelandic model and beauty pageant titleholder who won Miss Universe Iceland 2016 and represented Iceland in Miss Universe 2016.

Early and personal life
Hildur María was born and raised in Kópavogur, Iceland. She works for Icelandair as a flight attendant.

Pageantry
On 12 September 2016, Hildur María won the title of Miss Universe Iceland 2016 and became the first representative from Iceland in Miss Universe since 2009. She competed at Miss Universe 2016 but was unplaced.

References

1992 births
Hildur Maria Leifsdottir
Miss Universe 2016 contestants
Hildur Maria Leifsdottir
Hildur Maria Leifsdottir
Living people
Flight attendants